In enzymology, a diaminobutyrate acetyltransferase is an enzyme that catalyzes the chemical reaction

acetyl-CoA + L-2,4-diaminobutanoate  CoA + N4-acetyl-L-2,4-diaminobutanoate

Thus, the two substrates of this enzyme are acetyl-CoA and L-2,4-diaminobutanoate, whereas its two products are CoA and N4-acetyl-L-2,4-diaminobutanoate.

This enzyme belongs to the family of transferases, specifically those acyltransferases transferring groups other than aminoacyl groups.  The systematic name of this enzyme class is acetyl-CoA:L-2,4-diaminobutanoate N4-acetyltransferase. Other names in common use include L-2,4-diaminobutyrate acetyltransferase, L-2,4-diaminobutanoate acetyltransferase, EctA, diaminobutyric acid acetyltransferase, DABA acetyltransferase, 2,4-diaminobutanoate acetyltransferase, DAB acetyltransferase, DABAcT, and acetyl-CoA:L-2,4-diaminobutanoate 4-N-acetyltransferase.  This enzyme participates in glycine, serine and threonine metabolism.

References

 
 
 
 
 

EC 2.3.1
Enzymes of unknown structure